Sharon Davis (born 1937) is a classical composer, pianist and music publisher. She is best known for her works Suite of Wildflowers, op. 1; Three Moods of Emily Dickinson; and Three Poems of William Blake. Her Though Men Call Us Free, written for soprano, clarinet and piano, draws upon words from Oscar Wilde's The Young King. In the 1970s she performed with the Los Angeles Brass Quintet, and Chamber Music Quarterly described her as a "fine musician". Davis is the widow of composer William Schmidt and now manages his music publishing company, Western International Music Inc., in Greeley, Colorado.

References

External links
Delcina Stevenson & Sharon Davis performing Six Songs on Poems of William Pillin for soprano and piano
Delcina Stevenson et al. performing Three Poems of William Blake for soprano and solo low clarinet (alto, bass and contrabass)
Delcina Stevenson et al. performing Though Men Call Us Free for soprano, clarinet and piano
Delcina Stevenson et al. performing Three Moods of Emily Dickinson for soprano, violin, cello and piano
Sharon Davis performing her Cocktail Etudes for solo piano
Sharon Davis performing Rayner Brown's Sonata Breve for solo piano

American women composers
20th-century American composers
1937 births
Living people
American classical pianists
American women classical pianists
American music publishers (people)
20th-century American pianists
20th-century American women pianists
21st-century classical pianists
21st-century American women pianists
21st-century American pianists
20th-century women composers